Nonkilling, popularised as a concept in the 2002 book Nonkilling Global Political Science, by Glenn D. Paige, refers to the absence of killing, threats to kill, and conditions conducive to killing in human society. Even though the use of the term in academia refers mostly to the killing of human beings, it is sometimes extended to include the killing of animals and other forms of life. This is also the case for the traditional use of the term "nonkilling" (or "non-killing") as part of Buddhist ethics, as expressed in the first precept of the Pancasila, and in similar terms throughout world spiritual traditions (see Nonkilling studies). Significantly, "nonkilling" was used in the "Charter for a World without Violence" approved by the 8th World Summit of Nobel Peace Laureates.

Origins
The origin of the concept of non-killing can be traced back to ancient Indian philosophy. The concept arises from the broader concept of nonviolence or ahimsa, which is one of the cardinal virtues and an important tenet of Jainism, Hinduism and Buddhism. It is a multidimensional concept, inspired by the premise that all living beings have the spark of the divine spiritual energy; therefore, to hurt another being is to hurt oneself. It has also been related to the notion that any violence has karmic consequences. While ancient scholars of Hinduism pioneered and over time perfected the principles of ahimsa, the concept reached an extraordinary status in the ethical philosophy of Jainism.

Historically, several early Indian and Greek philosophers advocated for and preached ahimsa and non-killing. Parsvanatha, the twenty-third tirthankara of Jainism, was one of the earliest person to preach the concept of ahimsa and non-killing around the 8th century BCE. Mahavira, the twenty-fourth and last tirthankara, then further strengthened the idea in the 6th century BCE. The earliest Greek philosophers who advocated for ahimsa and non-killing is Pythagoras. The Indian philosopher Valluvar has written exclusive chapters on ahimsa and non-killing in his work of the Tirukkural.

Terms
In analysis of its causes, nonkilling encompasses the concepts of peace (absence of war and conditions conducive to war), nonviolence (psychological, physical, and structural), and ahimsa (noninjury in thought, word and deed). Not excluding any of the latter, nonkilling provides a distinct approach characterized by the measurability of its goals and the open-ended nature of its realization. While the usage of terms such as "nonviolence" and "peace" often follow the classical form of argument through abstract ideas leading to passivity, killing (and its opposite, nonkilling), it can be quantified and related to specific causes, for example by following a public health perspective (prevention, intervention and post-traumatic transformation toward the progressive eradication of killing), as in the World Report on Public Health.

In relation to psychological aggression, physical assault, and torture intended to terrorize by manifest or latent threat to life, nonkilling implies removal of their psychosocial causes. In relation to killing of humans by socioeconomic structural conditions that are the product of direct lethal reinforcement as well as the result of diversion of resources for purposes of killing, nonkilling implies removal of lethality-linked deprivations. In relation to threats to the viability of the biosphere, nonkilling implies absence of direct attacks upon life-sustaining resources as well as cessation of indirect degradation associated with lethality. In relation to forms of accidental killing, nonkilling implies creation of social and technological conditions conducive to their elimination.

Approach

Paige's nonkilling approach has strongly influenced the discourse of nonviolence. Paige's position is that if we are able to imagine a global society that enjoys an absence of killing, we would be able to diminish and even reverse the present harmful effects of killing and utilize the resulting public funding saved from manufacturing and employing weapons to create a more benevolent, richer and more socially just world.

Nonkilling does not set any predetermined path for the achievement of a killing-free society in the same way as some ideologies and spiritual traditions that foster the restraint from the taking of life do. As an open-ended approach, it appeals to infinite human creativity and variability, encouraging continuous explorations in the fields of education, research, social action and policy making, by developing a broad range of scientific, institutional, educational, political, economic and spiritual alternatives to human killing. Also, in spite of its specific focus, nonkilling also tackles broader social issues.

A considerable literature on nonkilling describes various theoretical and conceptual approaches to nonkilling and codifies a set of potentially useful conceptual lenses. Nonkilling Global Political Science (NKGPS) advocates a threefold paradigmatic shift in human society to the absence of killing, of threats to kill, and of conditions conducive to killing. Paige's stance is to create a society free from killing, thereby reversing the existing deleterious effects of killing, and instead employ the public monies saved from producing and using weapons to create a benevolent, wealthier and overall more socially just society. Since Paige introduced his framework, a body of associated scholarship, guided by the Center for Global Nonkilling, a Honolulu-based NGO with Special Consultative Status with the United Nations Economic and Social Council, has developed across a variety of disciplines. Through academic work sponsored by the center, it has both associated NKGPS with previous nonviolent or peace-building scholarship from different religious frameworks, including Buddhism, Christianity, Hinduism, and Islam,. and expanded on these traditions, providing it a broad functional and moral inheritance. Within the NKGPS approach, preventing violence and encouraging peacebuilding involves applying NKGPS as a global political science through advocacy work in favour of a paradigmatic shift from killing to nonkilling, utilizing various conceptual lenses. Paige's own work focused on the Korean peninsular, but scholars have applied NKGPS to a wide variety of regional and national conflicts, for example the Balkans and the Philippines.

The nonkilling approach emphasizes that a global nonkilling society is not free of conflict, but that the overall structure of society and processes do not originate in or rely on killing. Paige introduced a wide array of concepts to support nonkilling. For instance, Paige advocated the societal adoption of three main concepts of peace, namely the absence of war and of conditions that might lead to war; nonviolence, at the psychological, physical, or structural levels; and ahimsa, that is, noninjury in thought, word and deed, whether from religious or secular traditions. Paige also advocated a taxonomy for assessing individuals and societies::76 prokilling⁠—consider killing positively beneficial for self or civilisation;
 killing-prone⁠—inclined to kill or to support killing when advantageous;
 ambikilling⁠—equally inclined to kill or not to kill, and to support or oppose it;
 killing-avoiding⁠—predisposed not to kill or to support it but prepared to do so;
 nonkilling⁠—committed not to kill and to change conditions conducive to lethality.Another concept introduced by Paige is the ‘funnel of killing’. In this five-fold lens for viewing society, people kill in a ‘killing zone’ which can range from a single location to theatres of war and which is the actual place where the killing occurs; learn to kill in a ‘socialisation zone’, such as a military base; are educated to accept killing as necessary and valid in a ‘cultural conditioning zone’; inhabit a ‘structural reinforcement zone’, where socioeconomic influences, organisations and institutions, together with material means, prompt and sustain a killing discourse; and experience a  ‘neurobiochemical capability zone’, that is, immediate neurological and physical factors that lead to killing behaviours, such as genes for psychopathic behaviour. Paige advocated an ‘unfolding fan’ of nonkilling alternatives (Figure 1), which involves deliberate efforts in each zone to minimize killing.:76 In this alternative construction, killing zone interventions can take spiritual forms, for example faith-based mediation, or nonlethal technology interventions, for example stun guns or teargas. Transformations in socialization zone domains involve nonkilling socialization education, while interventions in the cultural conditioning zone occur via the arts and the media. In the structural reinforcement zone, socioeconomic conditions (such as a dependence on fossil fuels) are effected with the aim of avoiding any potential justification for lethality. Finally, in the killing zone, interventions along clinical, pharmacological, physical, or spiritual/meditative lines are designed to free people, for example the traumatised or psychopaths, from any tendencies to kill.

Various theoretical elaborations on nonkilliing exist. For instance, Motlagh introduced a fundamental objective hierarchy of steps to transform the social institutions that can contribute to nonkilling. Motlagh emphasizes that societal transformation towards nonkilling needs social institutions to adopt inspiring symbols of perpetual peace and concepts such as weapon-free zones, as well as actions like eliminating economic structures that support lethality, protecting the environment, and defending human rights.

In a broad conception, nonkilling opposes aggression, assassination, autogenocide, contract killing, corporate manslaughter, cultural genocide, capital punishment, democide, domestic killings, ethnic cleansing, ethnocide, femicide, feticide, gendercide, genocide, honor killing, ritual killings, infanticide, linguicide, mass murder, murder–suicide, omnicide, policide, politicide, regicide, school shootings, structural violence, suicide, terrorism, thrill killing, tyrannicide, violence, war, and other forms of killing, direct, indirect or structural.

Practical uses 
Nonkilling applications directly relate to the human right to life and the coralative duty, vested on the State and the people, to respect and protect life. In various domains, humanity is progressing and violence is regressing. A lot still remains to be done. From traffic casualties to the refusal of violence, through the prevention of suicides and all other examples, the nonkilling concept calls for more reverence for life and enjoyment of living.

See also 

 
 Ahimsa
 Anti-nuclear movement
 Center for Global Nonkilling
 Civil resistance
 Glenn D. Paige
 List of nonviolence scholars and leaders
 List of peace activists
 Nonkilling Anthropology
 Nonkilling Psychology 
 Nonviolence
 Nonviolent resistance
 Satyagraha
 Veganism
 Vegetarianism
 World peace

References

External links 

 Glenn D. Paige, Nonkilling Global Political Science, 2002; 3rd ed. 2009.
 Glenn D. Paige, Joám Evans Pim, editors, Global Nonkilling Leadership, 2009.
 School of Nonkilling Studies at Wikiversity
 Center for Global Nonkilling
 Center for Global Nonkilling Channel on YouTube
 Charter for a World without Violence

Nonviolence
Homicide